Karen Hollins (also Teale)  is a fictional character from the BBC soap opera Doctors, portrayed by Jan Pearson. Introduced as a receptionist at the fictional Mill Health Centre, Karen was created by series producer Peter Eryl Lloyd as a replacement for former receptionist Vivien March (Anita Carey). She first appeared during the episode broadcast on 23 February 2009. Karen is the wife of police sergeant Rob (Chris Walker) and the mother of Imogen (Charlie Clemmow) and Jack (Nicolas Woodman). Karen is depicted as a hardworking person who cares about her job and the patients at the surgery, but someone who prioritises her family above her work responsibilities.

Karen's storylines in the programme have included becoming a healthcare assistant, having an abortion, the breakdown and reconciliation of her marriage to Rob, becoming a foster parent, and having amnesia after being involved a car accident. Pearson enjoys working with Walker to portray the fictional couple and they have stated that despite their numerous breakdowns, the pair will always be strong as a couple. Walker himself devised the storyline for Karen's memory loss and she was proud of the work that they both put into the year-long story arc. The pair received the British Soap Award for Best On-Screen Partnership in 2010, as well as receiving another nomination in 2022. For her portrayal of Karen, Pearson has been nominated for various awards including the British Soap Award for Best Leading Performer and Best Female Acting Performance at the RTS Midlands Awards.

Storylines
Karen is introduced as the head receptionist at the Mill Health Centre and the Campus Surgery at Letherbridge University. Karen tries to call her colleague Cherry Clay (Sophie Abelson) to tell her information about her boyfriend, Scott Nielson (Sam Heughan). However, he had died, with Cherry at his apartment. The situation escalates into a fight in reception, and Karen is suspended by Dr. Heston Carter (Owen Brenman) but returns the following week. The next day, her son Jack (Nicholas Woodman) informs her that he has seen Zara 'shooting up'. Karen visits Zara's house, where she discovers that Zara is injecting herself with testosterone to combat her early onset menopause. Karen is approached by Gerry Cutler (Steffan Rhodri), the father of Lewis (Alexander Vlahos), Jack's friend from university. He asks if Lewis can stay at their house over the Easter holidays, to which she accepts. Unknown to the Hollins family, Lewis has mental health issues. As the week continues, his problems become clear, but Lewis covers his tracks very easily. After Karen sees a knife mark in her kitchen table, she knows it was done by Lewis. Imogen then realises that her art project has been tampered with, by Lewis. Jack is called to a fake interview at the university, which is later revealed to be Lewis holding people hostage with a gun. Rob runs inside despite being warned not to, and helps Karen to defeat Lewis.

When Karen becomes pregnant, she does not want to have the baby, unlike husband Rob (Chris Walker), who wants another child. She informs him that she wants to have an abortion, which he disagrees with. She has the termination, and as a result, their relationship is initially strained. After Karen stays with her father for a while, she returns and tells Rob that she wants to reconcile their marriage. After Rob saves her from a burning building, they have a romantic meal and eventually reconcile. Karen's friend Angie Briggs (Den Woods) attempts to get her to see other men, but Karen refuses and stays with Rob. After Rob accidentally hits Karen with his car, she develops amnesia. She forgets who Rob and her children are and believes that she is 18. After she has recovered her memories and their children move out to attend higher education, Rob and Karen decide to become foster parents. Due to feeling incapable to be a foster parent, Rob meets with social worker Jane Fairweather (Patricia Potter) and lies to her by saying that Karen is unable to foster due to her amnesia. Jane informs Karen of this who is angry with Rob due to feeling responsible for his inabilities. When the pair foster Jayden Hunt (Ciaran Stow), a 14-year-old with epilepsy, they look into getting him medical aid for his seizures. They discover that Jayden has been using Karen's money to buy marijuana, since it eases his condition. Rob warns him not to do it again due to his police career being put at stake, but Karen disagrees. She meets with Iris Nicholson (Jenny Stokes), a local drug dealer, to buy Jayden marijuana. She is stopped by Rob's colleague, Pat Dyson (Dawn Butler), who states that she will not tell Rob. However, Karen later confesses to Rob what she has done; he is angry with her decision to go behind his back.

Development

Casting and characterisation
When Pearson was cast in the role of Karen, she was aware that her character was set to be given a husband and children. Producers asked Pearson for suggestions on who should play Karen's husband, but she left it to the casting director, joking that it was like an arranged marriage. The Hollins became the first large family unit in the series; Pearson revealed that the writers had resisted their urges to give them problems, instead making them a healthy and functional family. Pearson grew up in Wollaston, West Midlands, and was keen to represent their regional accent on television. She hoped people would not confuse her Black Country accent for a Birmingham accent, but acknowledged that people outside of the West Midlands may not realise the difference. She added that she chose to tone down her accent when playing Karen due to fears of people not understanding her.

Karen's BBC profile noted that while she is great with the patients at the surgery, she is a "complete hypochondriac" who "won't hesitate to pester the doctors for a diagnosis". It added that while she is dedicated to her role in the surgery, she prioritises her family, so if there were to be a family emergency, Karen will be "straight out the door". On Karen becoming a healthcare assistant, the profile explained that although she appears confident while her job responsibilities increase, she does not have complete faith in her abilities, and if she feels it necessary she will seek advice from a more experienced colleague. Pearson initially found it difficult to portray the comedic side to the character, for she had not played a comedic role prior to Doctors. She also appreciated how "comedic and camp" Doctors can be and noted how often she gets to dress up on the soap, with costumes including the Mad Hatter and a black PVC bondage suit. Pearson joked that although she loved it, she missed her nurse uniform from her time appearing as Kath Fox on Holby City.

Marriage to Rob and memory loss
Walker and Pearson spoke to Digital Spy about their onscreen chemistry. Talking about their first scenes together, Walker said: "First day on set, in fact first scene it was, 'Hi I'm Chris', 'Hi I'm Jan', right get into bed. So that broke the ice." When asked why they work so well together on the soap, he explained: "I think that we're not precious with our own stuff and we always want to give and help each other and that's nice, and we do row very well." After Karen's abortion, her BBC profile explained that Rob's "uncompromising stance" on the decision to terminate the baby pushed Karen away from him emotionally. In 2021, Walker spoke again about their relationship to Inside Soap after the pair had become experienced foster parents. While dealing with a difficult case involving a child with anger management issues, Karen hides details from Rob about the incidents. Walker stated that the situation would "cause friction" in their relationship, and compared the "different skills and different ways" that the pair deal with problems. However, Walker explained that despite the situation, they are still "so strong as a couple" and that with Rob and Karen, "you always get the feeling that they'll get through it somehow".

After Karen becomes involved in a memory loss storyline, Pearson revealed that Walker had devised the storyline. Speaking to Digital Spy at the launch of Pentahotel Birmingham, Pearson explained: "The story has been hugely long and it's still going on. I've been filming it for a year now. It was very exciting because it was Chris's idea. I think his original idea was that Karen would be run over by some ex of Rob's. The producers didn't run with that, but they did run with the accident and the memory loss. I was utterly delighted that Chris was responsible for running me over! We now have a very playful banter over who's to blame for the situation!" Pearson also added: "We always knew that Karen and Rob were going to get back together in the end, but the break-up made a nice change from what we normally do. Because it was Chris's storyline and his idea, I really wanted to give it my best shot. What Chris came up with was very detailed - it was extraordinary. If the acting career doesn't work out for him, I think he's got a really good shot as a storyliner".

Reception
Alongside Walker, Pearson won the award for Best On-Screen Partnership at the British Soap Awards. A year later, she was nominated for Best Storyline and Best Single Episode for her portrayal of Karen going through her pregnancy and eventual abortion storyline. Pearson was also nominated for Best Comedy Performance at the 2012 British Soap Awards. In 2014, Pearson received a nomination for Best Female Acting Performance at the RTS Midlands Awards. As well as these nominations, Pearson has been longlisted for Best Actress at the British Soap Awards four times; 2013, 2014, 2016 and 2018. Following a change to Pearson's hair, Jane Corscadden of The Focus wrote that "she looks fantastic", with viewers echoing the comment. In 2022, Pearson was nominated for the British Soap Award for Best Leading Performer, as well as herself and Walker receiving another nomination for Best On-Screen Partnership.

See also
 List of Doctors characters (2009)

References

External links
 Karen Hollins at BBC Online

Doctors (2000 TV series) characters
Fictional receptionists
Fictional characters with amnesia
Female characters in television
Television characters introduced in 2009